Paul Mooney may refer to:

Sports
 Paul Mooney (cricketer) (born 1976), Irish cricketer
 Paul Mooney (footballer) (1901–1980), Scottish footballer
 Paul Mooney (rugby union) (1930–2006), Australian rugby union player
 Paul A. Mooney (died 2000), American sports executive

Others
 Paul Mooney (comedian) (1941–2021), American comedian, writer, television and film actor
 Paul Mooney (writer) (1904–1939), American writer
 Paul Mooney (college president), president, National College of Ireland
 Paul Mooney (priest) (born 1958), Dean of Ferns

See also
 Paul Muni (1895–1967), American actor